Ralph Lauren (born October 14, 1939) is an American fashion designer, philanthropist, and billionaire businessman, best known for the Ralph Lauren Corporation, a global multibillion-dollar enterprise. He has become well known for his collection of rare automobiles, some of which have been displayed in museum exhibits. Lauren stepped down as CEO of the company in September 2015 but remains executive chairman and chief creative officer. As of April 2022, his net worth was estimated at US$6.9 billion.

Early life 
Ralph Lauren was born on October 14, 1939, in the Bronx, New York City, to Ashkenazi Jewish immigrants, Frieda (Cutler) and Frank Lifshitz, an artist and house painter, from Pinsk, Second Polish Republic, now Belarus. His mother was from Drohiczyn, Poland. The youngest of four siblings, he has two brothers and one sister. At age 16, he legally changed his second name from Lifshitz to Lauren along with his brother George Poitras Lauren due to bullying at school. Lauren's choice of the name followed his older brother Jerry Lauren, who had first done so after experiencing bullying in the US Airforce.  

Lauren attended day school followed by the Manhattan Talmudical Academy, before eventually graduating from DeWitt Clinton High School in 1957. He went to Baruch College of the City University of New York (CUNY), where he studied business, although he dropped out after two years.

Lauren was one of several design leaders raised in the Jewish community in the Bronx, along with Calvin Klein and Robert Denning.

Career

Early career
From 1962 to 1964 Lauren served in the United States Army. After his discharge, he worked briefly for Brooks Brothers as a sales assistant before becoming a salesman for Rivetz, a necktie company. At age 28, working for tie manufacturer Beau Brummell, Lauren convinced the company president to let him start his own line. He launched The Ralph Lauren Corporation in 1967 with men's ties.

Polo

Drawing on his interests in sports, Lauren named his first full line of menswear 'Polo' in 1968. He worked out of a single "drawer" from a showroom in the Empire State Building and made deliveries to stores himself. By 1969, the Manhattan department store Bloomingdale's sold Lauren's men’s line exclusively. It was the first time that Bloomingdale's had given a designer their own in-store boutique.

 In 1971, Ralph Lauren Corporation launched a line of tailored shirts for women, which introduced the Polo player emblem to the world for the first time, appearing on the shirt's cuff. The first full women's collection was launched the following year. In 1971 Lauren also opened a store on Rodeo Drive in Beverly Hills, California; this was the first freestanding store for an American designer.

In 1972, the Ralph Lauren Corporation introduced a signature cotton mesh Polo shirt in various colors. Featuring the polo player logo at the chest, the shirt became emblematic of the preppy look—one of Ralph Lauren's signature styles. The tagline for the ad campaign was: "Every team has its color – Polo has seventeen."

In 1974, he outfitted the male cast of The Great Gatsby in costumes from his Polo line – a 1920s-style series of men's suits and sweaters, except for the pink suit which Lauren designed especially for Robert Redford's Jay Gatsby. In 1977, Diane Keaton and Woody Allen wore Lauren's clothes throughout their Oscar-winning film, Annie Hall.

Fragrance

The first Ralph Lauren fragrances, produced by Warner-Lauren, Ltd. were launched at Bloomingdale's in March 1978. Lauren, a fragrance for women, on March 12 and Polo, cologne for men, on March 26. This was the first time that a designer had introduced two fragrances – one for men and one for women – simultaneously. The company entered the European market, and went international in 1981 with the opening of the first freestanding store for an American designer on New Bond Street in the West End of London, England.

Later 20th century

Ralph Lauren opened his first flagship in the Rhinelander mansion, on Madison Avenue and 72nd Street in New York City in 1986. Lauren re-created the building's original opulence with a young design consultant named Naomi Leff, with whom he had previously worked on Ralph Lauren Home. The Polo Sport line was introduced in 1992 followed by over ten additional lines and acquired brands, including Ralph Lauren Purple Label in 1995 and Lauren Ralph Lauren in 1996.

On June 12, 1997, the company became a publicly traded company on the New York Stock Exchange.

The 98-seat restaurant RL opened in March 1999 in Chicago in a newly constructed building adjacent to the largest Ralph Lauren store at the corner of Chicago and Michigan Avenues. It was followed by the opening of two additional restaurants – Ralph's at 173 Boulevard Saint Germain Paris flagship store in 2010 and The Polo Bar at Polo's flagship in New York in 2015.

Later years
The company launched its website and online shop in 2000 as polo.com by RL Media (a cooperation between Ralph Lauren and NBC). In 2007, Ralph Lauren Corporation acquired the NBC share of RL Media and the web site was relaunched as ralphlauren.com. In 2008, Ralph Lauren Corporation launched a brand called American Living, exclusively for JCPenney. It was the largest cross-category brand launch in the history of Ralph Lauren and JCPenney. On September 29, 2015, it was announced that Stefan Larsson would replace the company's founder, Ralph Lauren, as CEO in November. Lauren will stay on as executive chairman and chief creative officer.

Lauren has appeared on over 100 magazine covers including Architectural Digest, GQ, Forbes, Town & Country, TIME and Vogue.

Lauren celebrated the 50th anniversary of his brand in a  fashion show at Bethesda Terrace in Central Park on September 8, 2018. Attendees included Oprah Winfrey, Hillary Clinton, Kanye West, Robert DeNiro, and Jessica Chastain.

Personal life

Family
On December 20, 1964, Lauren married Ricky Ann Loew-Beer in New York City. She is the daughter of Margaret Vytouch and Rudolph Loew-Beer. The two had met six months earlier, in a doctor's office where she was working as a receptionist and on alternate days teaching dance. She is the author of The Hamptons: Food, Family and History.

They have three children: Andrew Lauren (b. 1969), a film producer and actor; David Lauren (b. 1971), an executive vice president at Ralph Lauren Corporation; and Dylan Lauren (b. 1974). In September 2011, David married Lauren Bush, granddaughter of former U.S. President George H. W. Bush. Lauren and David have two children and live in Manhattan. Dylan Lauren, owner of Dylan's Candy Bar in New York City, was married in June 2011 to hedge fund manager Paul Arrouet. Dylan and Paul welcomed twins on April 13, 2015, via surrogate in New York City.

In April 1987, Ralph Lauren underwent surgery to remove a benign brain tumor and made a full recovery.

Lauren owns a 17,000-acre cattle ranch in Ridgway, Colorado, and a 17,000 sq foot manor built in 1919 in Bedford, New York.

Automobile collection

Ralph Lauren is well known as a collector of automobiles, with about 100 automobiles, some being extremely rare. He owns a 1962 Ferrari 250 GTO, two Ferrari TRs, three 1996 McLaren F1s (one of them an ultra-rare McLaren F1 LM), a Mercedes-Benz 300 SL Gullwing, a 1929 Bentley 4½ Litre ("Blower Bentley"), one Bugatti Type 57SC Atlantic, a 1937 Bugatti Type 57SC Gangloff, a Porsche 911 GT3 RS, a Bugatti Veyron, a 1930  Mercedes-Benz SSK "Count Trossi" (aka "The Black Prince"), a 1938 Alfa Romeo 8C 2900B Mille Miglia. and a rare Lamborghini Reventón Roadster.

His cars have won "Best of Show" at the Pebble Beach Concours d'Elegance twice, his 1938 Bugatti Type 57SC Atlantic won in 1990 and his 1930 Mercedes-Benz SSK "Count Trossi" roadster won in 1993. In 2005 his collection was displayed at Boston's Museum of Fine Arts. Seventeen cars from his collection were exhibited at the Musée des Arts Décoratifs, Paris, in 2011. In 2017, Lauren's now $600 million dollar car collection took center stage during New York Fashion Week.

Philanthropy
Lauren stated in May 2014, "I hate when people call me philanthropic because I see it as more coming from the heart."

In 1989 Lauren co-founded the Nina Hyde Center for Breast Cancer Research at Georgetown University Hospital in Washington D.C. in memory of the late Post fashion correspondent. He served as chairman and created the name and symbol for Fashion Targets Breast Cancer, a charitable initiative of the CFDA that founded in 1994 that marshals the goodwill and services of the fashion industry to raise public awareness and funds for breast cancer internationally.

In 2000 the Ralph Lauren Corporation launched its Volunteer Program, which energizes employees and creates meaningful connections with the communities in which they work. On Friday, September 15, Ralph Lauren Corporation launched the Pink Pony Campaign, a national initiative to reduce disparities in cancer care by raising awareness as well as enhancing prevention, screening, and treatment in poor and underserved communities.

The Polo Ralph Lauren Foundation established the American Heroes Fund following the September 11th attacks to allow Polo's 10,000 employees worldwide, as well as their customers, the opportunity to participate in the relief effort.

In 2003, Lauren supported the establishment the Ralph Lauren Center for Cancer Care and Prevention in Harlem. The Center is a collaboration between Ralph Lauren, Memorial Sloan-Kettering, and North General Hospital in Harlem, New York City.

The Polo Fashion School was established in 2004, in which Company executives work with inner-city youth to offer insights into the fashion business. Established in 2006, the Polo Jeans G.I.V.E. (Get Involved, Volunteer, Exceed) campaign was created to inspire and encourage community service through volunteerism by supporting the efforts of dedicated volunteers and their causes.

The Star-Spangled Banner, the original 1813 flag that inspired Francis Scott Key to write the United States National Anthem, was preserved by a $10 million contribution to Save America's Treasures from Polo Ralph Lauren in 1998. The flag was then unveiled on Wednesday, November 19, 2008, in a new gallery at the Smithsonian National Museum of American History, in Washington, D.C.

Ralph Lauren Corporation announced in July 2013 its commitment to restore the elite École des Beaux-Arts in Paris, one of the most influential art schools in France.

In 2014, the Ralph Lauren Corporation partnered with the Royal Marsden, the largest and most comprehensive cancer center in Europe, to develop a world-class breast cancer research facility. They opened the Royal Marsden Ralph Lauren Center for Breast Cancer Research in 2016.

Politics
Lauren is a regular donor to the Democratic Party.

Awards and honors
{| class="sortable wikitable plainrowheaders"
! scope="col" width=50 | Year
! scope="col" width=700 | Award & Honor
|-
| align=center | 1970
| A jury of men's fashion editors select Lauren to receive the Coty Award for the highest creativity of the year in men's fashion design. 
|-
| align=center | 1973
| Ralph Lauren wins his second Coty Award for menswear. It is the first time a menswear designer has been a two-time Coty winner.
|-
| align=center | 1974
| Ralph Lauren wins his first Coty "Winnie" Award for womenswear.
|-
| align=center | 1975
| Ralph Lauren wins the American Fashion Award. (Council of Fashion Designers of America)
|-
| align=center | 1976
| Ralph Lauren enters the Coty Hall of Fame for Menswear, and also wins his second Coty Award for Womenswear, the first time a designer has won awards for both menswear and womenswear in the same year.
|-
| align=center | 1977
| Ralph Lauren receives the Coty Hall of Fame award for womenswear.
|-
| align=center | 1979
| Ralph Lauren receives his first special citation at the 1979 Coty Awards for his direct influence in establishing American fashion on a worldwide basis.
|-
| align=center | 1981
| At the first Council of Fashion Designers of America award ceremony, Ralph Lauren wins his first CFDA Fashion Award.
|-
| align=center | 1985
| Ralph Lauren receives the Menswear Association of America's Designer Achievement Award.
|-
| align=center | 1987
| At the CFDA Awards, Ralph Lauren is awarded 1986 "Retailer of the Year" for transforming the  cinematic feel of his clothing into a physical environment.
|-
| align=center | 1988
| Pratt Institute awards Ralph Lauren with an honorary Doctorate of Fine Arts.
|-
| align=center | 1989
| Ralph Lauren receives The American Academy of Achievement's Golden Plate Award in 1989 for fashion and design. The Awards are presented annually by the Academy of Achievement to approximately 25 recipients, chosen for their exceptional accomplishments in the sciences, professions, business, industry, arts, literature, sports, entertainment, and public service.
|-
| align=center | 1992
| Ralph Lauren receives the first-ever CFDA Lifetime Achievement award—an honor created specifically for him and presented with heartfelt recognition by Audrey Hepburn.
|-
| align=center | 1995
| Ralph Lauren receives the CFDA award for Womenswear Designer of the Year.
|-
| align=center | 1996
| Ralph Lauren is honored with the Nina Hyde Center for Breast Cancer Research's first Humanitarian Award, which is presented to Lauren by Princess Diana.
|-
| align=center | 1996
| Receives an Honorary Doctorate of Humane Letters from Brandeis University for his commitment to arts and education, and for his prominent role in the fight against breast cancer.
|-
| align=center | 1996
| Ralph Lauren receives the CFDA award for Menswear Designer of the Year. 
|-
| align=center | 1997
| Ralph Lauren wins CFDA's Award for Humanitarian Leadership in recognition of his commitment to fighting breast cancer.
|-
| align=center | 2000
| In celebration of his contribution to American style, Ralph Lauren is among the first designers inducted into the Fashion Walk of Fame in the center of New York City's Fashion District.(Garment District, Manhattan)
|-
| align=center | 2003
| Ralph Lauren Corporation receives a Restore America Heroes award from The National Trust for Historic Preservation.
|-
| align=center | 2007
| Ralph Lauren wins the American Fashion Legend Award, presented by Oprah Winfrey on June 4 at the CFDA Awards, held at the New York Public Library.
|-
| align=center | 2009
| Ralph Lauren wins the CFDA's newly created "Popular Vote Award". The award is given to the designer who receives the most votes cast online by the public.
|-
| align=center | 2010
| Mayor Michael Bloomberg presents Ralph Lauren with a key to the city of New York.
|-
| align=center | 2010
| In a private ceremony at the Élysée Palace, Ralph Lauren receives the prestigious Chevalier de la Légion d'honneur from Nicolas Sarkozy, President of the Republic of France, in recognition of his contributions as a designer, business leader, and philanthropist.
|-
| align=center | 2012
| Ralph Lauren tops the list for the global apparel industry category for the first time in Fortune magazine'''s "World's Most Admired Companies" 2012."
|-
| align=center | 2014
| The Company's "The Dog Walk Campaign" won the Clio Image Award in the category for Partnerships and & Sponsorships, while the Omotesando RRL Store in Tokyo, Japan wins for the category of Architectural Design.
|-
| align=center | 2014
| The Smithsonian presented Ralph Lauren with the James Smithson Bicentennial Medal. The medal recognizes Lauren's lifetime contributions to American entrepreneurship, artistry, and creativity as well as acknowledging the critical leadership role Lauren played in helping preserve the Star-Spangled Banner as part of "Save America's Treasures" initiative established by Hillary Clinton when she served as First Lady.
|-
| align=center | 2016
| Ralph Lauren and Leonardo DiCaprio were honored at the 50th Anniversary Riverkeeper Fishermen's Ball at Chelsea Piers in New York City.
|-
| align=center | 2016
| Ralph Lauren received Women's Wear Dailys inaugural John B. Fairchild Honor.
|-
| align=center | 2017
| Appointed an Honorary Knight Commander of the Order of the British Empire (KBE). On June 20, 2019, in a private ceremony at Buckingham Palace he received the award from Prince Charles.
|}

See also
 List of swimwear brands

Further reading
 Gross, Michael. Genuine Authentic: The Real Life of Ralph Lauren. Harper, New York 2003.
 Trachtenberg, Jeffrey A. Ralph Lauren: The Man behind the Mystique. Little, Brown and Company New York 1981.
 McDowell, Colin. Ralph Lauren: The Man, The Vision, The Style. Rizzoli, New York 2002.

References

External links

 Ralph Lauren website
 
 Ralph Lauren Center for Cancer Care and Prevention
 Profile of Ralph Lauren at Men's Vogue Ralph Lauren Auto Collection at worldcarfans.com
 Ralph Lauren Classic Automobile Collection at Wired''

1939 births
Living people
American fashion designers
American billionaires
Businesspeople from New York City
American chief executives of fashion industry companies
American car collectors
Baruch College alumni
DeWitt Clinton High School alumni
Jewish American philanthropists
American Ashkenazi Jews
Lauren family
United States Army soldiers
Jewish fashion designers
Chevaliers of the Légion d'honneur
Honorary Knights Commander of the Order of the British Empire
American people of Belarusian-Jewish descent
American people of Polish-Jewish descent
People from Katonah, New York
Menswear designers
People from Ridgway, Colorado
Philanthropists from New York (state)